Amanda Frances Lillian Lohrey (born 13 April 1947) is an Australian writer and novelist.

Career 
Lohrey completed her education at the University of Tasmania before taking up a scholarship at the University of Cambridge. From 1988 to 1994 she lectured in writing and textual studies at the University of Technology, Sydney.  She has held the position of lecturer in School of English, Media Studies and Art History at the University of Queensland in Brisbane in 2002, and joined the Australian National University School of Literature, Languages, and Linguistics as a visiting fellow in 2016 where she continues to write fiction.

Awards and nominations

 1988 shortlisted New South Wales Premier's Literary Awards Christina Stead Prize for Fiction The Reading Group
1996 winner Australian Literature Society Gold Medal Camille's Bread
 1996 winner Victorian Premier's Literary Award Vance Palmer Prize for Fiction Camille's Bread
 1996 shortlisted Miles Franklin Award Camille's Bread
 2005 longlisted Miles Franklin Award The Philosopher's Doll
 2006 longlisted International Dublin Literary Award The Philosopher's Doll
 2011 winner Queensland Premier's Literary Award Reading Madame Bovary
 2012 Patrick White Award
2021 winner Miles Franklin Award The Labyrinth
2021 winner Voss Literary Prize, The Labyrinth
2021 winner Prime Minister's Literary Award for Fiction, The Labyrinth

Bibliography

Novels

 The Morality of Gentlemen (1984)
 The Reading Group (1988)
 Camille's Bread (1995)
 The Philosopher's Doll (2004)
 Vertigo (2008)
 Reading Madame Bovary (2010)
 A Short History of Richard Kline (2015)
 The Labyrinth (2020)

Essays 
 The Clear Voice Suddenly Singing. An essay in Secrets by Drusilla Modjeska, Amanda Lohrey, Robert Dessaix. Pan MacMillan, 1997
 The Project of the Self under Late-Capitalism. The Best Australian Essays 2001, pp. 246 – 65. Black Inc/Schwartz Publishing Pty Ltd
 Reading Madame Bovary. The Best Australian Stories 2002, pp. 14 – 39. Black Inc/Schwartz Publishing Pty Ltd
 Groundswell: The Rise of the Greens Quarterly Essay 8. 2002 pp. 1 – 86. Black Inc/Schwartz Publishing Pty Ltd
 Writing The Morality of Gentlemen. Hecate, Vol. 30, 2004 pp. 193 – 200. Hecate Press
 Enrolment Daze, The Monthly, No.7, November 2005
 Celebrating the secular. Cultural Studies Review, Vol. 12, 2006 pp. 202 – 206 John Libbey & Company Pty Ltd
 Voting for Jesus, Christianity and Politics in Australia.  Quarterly Essay 22. 2006. Black Inc.
 Green Christine, The Monthly, No.31, February 2008
 A Welcome Contradiction: Gambler and MONA founder David Walsh has written a book, The Monthly, December 2014 - January 2015

External links 
  Transcript of interview with Ramona Koval, the Book Show, ABC Radio National, on her novel Vertigo, 10 November 2008.

References

1947 births
Living people
20th-century Australian novelists
21st-century Australian novelists
Australian essayists
Australian women novelists
University of Tasmania alumni
Alumni of the University of Cambridge
20th-century Australian women writers
Miles Franklin Award winners
ALS Gold Medal winners
Writers from Tasmania
People from Hobart
21st-century Australian women writers
20th-century essayists
21st-century essayists